Ruslan Mitkov is a professor at the University of Wolverhampton, and a researcher in Natural Language Processing and Computational Linguistics. He completed his PhD at Technical University of Dresden under the supervision of Nikolaus Joachim Lehmann. He has published more than 240 refereed papers and is best known for his contributions to Anaphora Resolution, and his seminal work in computer-aided generation of multiple-choice tests among others.

Mitkov is the sole editor of the Oxford Handbook of Computational Linguistics (Oxford University Press) and the author of the book Anaphora Resolution (published by Longman), which have become standard textbooks in their fields. He is also the co-founder and editor-in-chief of the Cambridge journal Natural Language Engineering and the editor-in-chief of John Benjamins’ book series in Natural Language Processing.

Selected works
 1998. Robust pronoun resolution with limited knowledge, Proceedings of the 36th Annual Meeting of the Association for Computational Linguistics and 17th International Conference on Computational Linguistics-Volume 2
 2001. Introduction to the special issue on computational anaphora resolution. Mitkov, Ruslan, Branimir Boguraev, and Shalom Lappin. Computational Linguistics 27.4 (2001): 473-477.
 2003 Computer-aided generation of multiple-choice tests, Proceedings of the HLT-NAACL 03 workshop on Building educational applications using natural language processing-Volume 2

Honors and awards
 1993, 1994. Fellow of the Alexander von Humboldt Foundation
 2002. Keynote speaker at CICLing conference
 2011. Doctor Honoris Causa from Plovdiv University
 2012. Keynote speaker at TSD conference
 2014. Professor Honoris Causa from Veliko Tarnovo University

References

External links
 Ruslan Mitkov's Home Page
 Google Scholar page
 Bio at the Bulgarian Academy of Sciences website

Computer scientists
Living people
Year of birth missing (living people)
Natural language processing researchers